Hendrik van Leeuwen (born 2 April 1951) is a Dutch former footballer who played as a forward. He made two appearances for the Netherlands national team in 1978.

References

External links
 

1951 births
Living people
Footballers from Rotterdam
Dutch footballers
Association football forwards
Netherlands international footballers
Eredivisie players
Feyenoord players
Roda JC Kerkrade players
ADO Den Haag players
FC Dordrecht players